Vulnerable may refer to:

General
Vulnerability
Vulnerability (computing)
Vulnerable adult
Vulnerable species

Music

Albums
Vulnerable (Marvin Gaye album), 1997
Vulnerable (Tricky album), 2003
Vulnerable (The Used album), 2012

Songs
 "Vulnerable" (Roxette song), 1994
 "Vulnerable" (Selena Gomez song), 2020
 "Vulnerable", a song by Secondhand Serenade from Awake, 2007
 "Vulnerable", a song by Pet Shop Boys from Yes, 2009
 "Vulnerable", a song by Tinashe from Black Water, 2013
 "Vulnerability", a song by Operation Ivy from Energy, 1989

Other uses
 Climate change vulnerability, vulnerability to anthropogenic climate change used in discussion of society's response to climate change
 Vulnerable, a scoring feature of the game of contract bridge where larger bonuses and penalties apply; see Glossary of contract bridge terms#Vulnerable

See also